Asan Seferovych Mustafayev (born 11 May 1965) is a Ukrainian-Tajikistani football coach and a former player. He works as a conditioning coach with the Tajikistan national football team.

References

External links
 

1965 births
Living people
Sportspeople from Dushanbe
Ukrainian people of Crimean Tatar descent
Soviet footballers
Tajikistani footballers
Ukrainian footballers
Association football defenders
Surkhon Termez players
FK Khujand players
CSKA Pamir Dushanbe players
Vakhsh Qurghonteppa players
FC SKA-Khabarovsk players
FC Sogdiana Jizzakh players
SC Tavriya Simferopol players
FC Okean Kerch players
FC Dinamo Sukhumi players
FC Bukovyna Chernivtsi players
FC Metalist Kharkiv players
FC Kremin Kremenchuk players
FC Podillya Khmelnytskyi players
FC Ural Yekaterinburg players
FC Zorya Luhansk players
Soviet First League players
Soviet Second League players
Soviet Second League B players
Ukrainian Premier League players
Ukrainian First League players
Russian Premier League players
Ukrainian expatriate footballers
Expatriate footballers in Russia